Pigritia arizonella is a moth in the family Blastobasidae. It is found in North America, including Arizona and California.

References

Moths described in 1910
Blastobasidae